is a passenger railway station located in Hodogaya-ku, Yokohama, Kanagawa Prefecture, Japan, operated by the East Japan Railway Company (JR East).

Lines
Hodogaya Station is served by the Yokosuka Line and Shōnan-Shinjuku Line and is 31.8 kilometers from the terminus of the Yokosuka Line at Tokyo Station.

Station layout 
The station consists of a single island platform serving two tracks which are jointly used by trains of both the Yokosuka Line and the Shōnan-Shinjuku Line. Trains of the Tōkaidō Main Line pass through Hodogaya Station, but do not stop.

The station is above ground, with an above-track station building. To the east side of the platform runs the Tōkaidō Main Line, which does not have a platform. On the north side there is a section of track for trains to go out of service on, as well as a place where trains from Yokohama can change directions and turn back. On the Yokohama side there is also a lineman's operating base. Because there was once a freight platform, there are two signals on the north side. When these signals are red, passenger trains must wait to depart. The station has a Midori no Madoguchi staffed ticket office.

Platforms

History 
Hodogaya Station was opened on July 11, 1887 as a station on the Japanese Government Railways (JGR), the predecessor to the post-war Japanese National Railways (JNR). Initially for passenger operations only, freight operations began the following year. In 1930 when Yokosuka Line trains were replaced by electric multiple units, all Tōkaidō Line trains ceased to stop at the station. 

Although the station was located in the town named , originally the station was named . The station was renamed to its present name 保土ヶ谷, with no change in pronunciation, on October 1, 1931 following the petition for the renaming by the mayor of Yokohama on July 8, 1927.

All freight operations were discontinued from October 1, 1979 when the new freight line that bypassed the station opened. Operation of Yokosuka Line trains was transferred from the tracks shared by the Tōkaidō Line trains to the former freight tracks in 1980. With the privatization of JNR on April 1, 1987, the station came under the operational control of JR East.

Passenger statistics
In fiscal 2019, the station was used by an average of 34,029 passengers daily (boarding passengers only).

The passenger figures (boarding passengers only) for previous years are as shown below.

Surrounding area
Japan National Route 1
Seirei Yokohama Hospital

See also
 List of railway stations in Japan

References

External links 

 JR Hodogaya Station 

Railway stations in Kanagawa Prefecture
Yokosuka Line
Tōkaidō Main Line
Shōnan-Shinjuku Line
Railway stations in Yokohama